Bragg is a single-member electoral district for the South Australian House of Assembly. The seat is named after the eminent physicists Bragg – William Henry and his son, William Lawrence. The electorate is largely suburban and encompasses a significant portion of the City of Burnside, stretching from the east parklands of Adelaide into the Adelaide Hills. After the redistribution following the 2006 election, the boundary moved eastwards to include suburbs that had formerly been in the electorate of Heysen and now borders Kavel. Bragg currently includes the metropolitan suburbs of Beaumont, Burnside, Cleland, Dulwich, Eastwood, Erindale, Frewville, Glenside, Glenunga, Greenhill, Hazelwood Park, Heathpool, Horsnell Gully, Leabrook, Leawood Gardens, Linden Park, Marryatville, Mount Osmond, Rose Park, Rosslyn Park, Skye, St Georges, Stonyfell, Toorak Gardens, Tusmore, Waterfall Gully, Wattle Park and part of Glen Osmond. (Previous suburbs prior to redistribution included Auldana, Beulah Park, Kensington, Kensington Park, and Kensington Gardens.)

The electorate was first contested at the 1970 election as a replacement for the abolished, larger electorate of Burnside, one of fifteen new electorates created in Adelaide to give the metropolitan area fairer representation. It has been held by the Liberals and their predecessors, the Liberal and Country League for its entire existence, and for most of that time has been the safest Liberal seat in the metropolitan area. The Liberals have always won outright majorities on the first count, and until 2022 never won less than 60 percent of the two-party vote.

As a measure of the strong Liberal support in this seat, the Liberals easily retained it even in the Labor landslides of 1977, 1985 and 2006, each time winning at least 55 percent of the primary vote. For example, in 2006 the Liberals suffered a swing of 6.8 percent in Bragg, but still comfortably retained it with a majority of 12.6 percent–the only safe metropolitan Liberal seat and one of only four safe Liberal seats statewide.

The seat has been held by only three members in its present incarnation, all of whom have gone on to serve in cabinet. Bragg's best-known member was its first, David Tonkin, who served as Premier of South Australia from 1979 to 1982. He resigned shortly after the Liberals lost the 1982 state election.  At the ensuing 1983 Bragg by-election fellow Liberal Graham Ingerson retained the seat without serious difficulty. Ingerson went on to become a minister under Dean Brown and John Olsen and served as Deputy Premier under Olsen from 1996 to 1998. Ingerson retired in 2002 and was succeeded by incumbent Vickie Chapman, two time Liberal leadership challenger and two time Liberal deputy leader from 2006 until 2009 and again since 2013. In 2018 Chapman became Deputy Premier.

In 2022, however, the Liberal margin dropped to 58 percent, making it only fairly safe for the first time. It is still the largest Liberal margin for a metropolitan seat.

On 19 April 2022, Chapman announced her intention to resign from politics and parliament, forcing a by-election, which was held on 2 July 2022.

Members for Bragg

Election results

Notes

References
 ECSA profile for Bragg: 2018
 ABC profile for Bragg: 2018
 Poll Bludger profile for Bragg: 2018

Electoral districts of South Australia
1970 establishments in Australia